The Vancouver version of the NWA Pacific Coast Tag Team Championship was the major tag team title in its National Wrestling Alliance-affiliated territory, NWA All-Star Wrestling, from 1961 until 1962, when it was replaced by the Vancouver version of the NWA Canadian Tag Team Championship.

Title history

External links
NWA Pacific Coast Tag Team title history (Vancouver)

References

National Wrestling Alliance championships
Regional professional wrestling championships
Professional wrestling in British Columbia